Kim Marie Johnson (born 25 August 1966) is a British Labour Party politician. She has been the Member of Parliament (MP) for Liverpool Riverside since the 2019 general election.

Early life and career
Kim is the daughter of Joseph Johnson and Kathleen Johnson. She has a Diploma in Youth and Community Work, a BA in Social Studies, and a Postgraduate Certificate.

Since 2015, Johnson has been the Chairperson of Squash Liverpool, a community interest company. In 2020, she became a patron of Mandela8.

Prior to becoming an MP, Johnson was a Unison shop steward. She held a role of creative diversity manager in the Capital of Culture bid team, representing the longest established black community in the country.

Parliamentary career 

On 4 November 2019, Johnson was selected as Labour's candidate for Liverpool Riverside by a panel made up of national, regional and local party representatives.  She replaced Dame Louise Ellman in that role after the latter chose to leave the party over the issue of anti-Semitism. She was elected at the 2019 general election, winning 41,170 votes, representing 78.0% of the vote. She sits on the Women and Equalities Committee, Education Committee and Speaker's Advisory Committee on Works of Art.  She is a member of the Socialist Campaign Group parliamentary caucus.

On 15 October 2020, Johnson resigned as Parliamentary Private Secretary to Angela Rayner to vote against the proposed Covert Human Intelligence Sources (Criminal Conduct) Bill, disagreeing with the Labour whip to abstain.

On 10 May 2021, Johnson publicly described the shadow cabinet reshuffle; specifically Keir Starmer's treatment of Angela Rayner as a "despicable act of cowardice". She again criticised the leadership after Starmer wrote an article for The Sun, a newspaper many in her Liverpool constituency had been boycotting after its coverage of the Hillsborough disaster.

In June 2022, Johnson accused Merseyside Police of being "institutionally racist" after officers carried out an armed stop and search of two black men in Liverpool.

In February 2023, while asking a question at Prime Minister's Questions, Johnson described the Israeli government as “fascist”. A spokesperson for the Labour Party described Johnson's comments as "completely unacceptable". Later the same day, Johnson raised a point of order in the House of Commons and apologised “unreservedly” for her language.

Personal life 
Johnson has a son and daughter.

References

External links

1960 births
Living people
Labour Party (UK) MPs for English constituencies
UK MPs 2019–present
21st-century British women politicians
Black British women politicians
Female members of the Parliament of the United Kingdom for English constituencies
Members of the Parliament of the United Kingdom for Liverpool constituencies
Trade unionists from Liverpool
Black British MPs